Ali Ejaz (21 October 1942 – 18 December 2018) was a Pakistani film and television actor known for his film roles in FBI Operation Pakistan (1971), Sona Chandi (1983), and Chor Machaye Shor (1996). He was given the Pride of Performance Award in 1993 by the President of Pakistan.

Early life and career
Syed Ali Ejaz Gillani was born in 1942 in Qila Gujar Singh, Lahore, He Belong to Gillani Syed Faimly who migrate from kotli Loharan east Sialkot to Lahore  His Father Name Is Syed Qalandar Ali Soharwardy Gillani, 

Comedian Munawwar Zareef was his class-fellow at school. He started his career with theatre in the 1960s. He was introduced to the film world by the film producer/director Shabab Keranvi who had met Ejaz in a bank. He also frequently acted in Pakistani television plays. While working at PTV, he trained a generation of artistes. His film roles and his pairing with actress Anjuman and actor Nannha were highly popular in Pakistan in the 1980s.

Social activist
In 2015, he launched a social welfare project near Sialkot, Punjab, Pakistan under his non-government organization (NGO), Ali Ejaz Foundation. This project, The Homes for the Welfare of the Old People, planned to build 132 homes within 3 years with donations from the public, industrialists and philanthropists.

Death
Ali Ejaz died on 18 December 2018 in Lahore at the age of 76 due to a cardiac arrest. Ali Ejaz had earlier suffered from paralysis a decade ago. He is survived by his widow and two sons who abandoned him in his last years by shifting the actor in the servant quarter. He was laid to rest at a local graveyard on Multan road Lahore in his fathers's shrine, the same day after his funeral prayer was offered at Ayubia market in Muslim Town, Lahore.

Filmography
He acted in 106 movies, 84 of which were Punjabi, 22 Urdu, and 1 Pashto. some are given below.
 Insaniyat (Pakistan film debut)
 Dilbar Jani (1969)
 Yamla Jatt (1969)
 Sayyan (1970)
 FBI Operation Pakistan (1971) (Alternate name for this film: Tiger Gang)
 Dil Aur Duniya (1971)
 Geo Jatta (1971)
 Sajjan Dushman (1972)
 Nizam (1972)
 Lalla Majnoo (1973)
 Ik Madari (1973)
 Jogi (1975)
 Sultana Daku (1975 film) (1975)
 Wehshi Jatt (1975)
 Hathkari (1975)
 Warrant (1976)
 Dubai Chalo (1979)
 Aap Se Kya Parda (1979)
 Sohra Te Jawai (1980)
 Chacha Bhateeja (1981)
 Muftbar (1981)
 Maula Jatt in London (1981)
 Maula Jat Te Nuri Nath (1981)
 Dostana (1982)
 Mirza Jat (1982)
 Sahib Jee (1983)
 Susral Chalo (1983)
 Samundar Par (1983)
 Sona Chandi (1983)
 Ishq Pecha (1984)
 Joora (1986)
 Chor Machaye Shor (1996)
 Dil Sanbhala Na Jaye (1998)

Popular TV shows
 Heer Ranjha (1972)
 Dubai Chalo (1979)
 Khawaja and Son (1987) – a popular Pakistani television comedy drama series 
 Lakhon Mein Teen
  Parosi
  Asghari Akhbari( 2011)
His other television hits include serials like Lakhon Mein Teen with Qavi Khan and Athar Shah Khan and Dubai Chalo(1979).

Awards and recognition
Pride of Performance Award by the President of Pakistan (1993)
Nigar Award for Best Comedian (1981)
Nigar Award for Best Comedian (1984)

References

External links
Filmography of actor 

1942 births
2018 deaths
21st-century Pakistani actors
Actors from Lahore
Actors in Urdu cinema
Male actors from Lahore
Punjabi people
Recipients of the Pride of Performance
Nigar Award winners
Pakistani television actors
Pakistani male film actors
Pakistani comedians
People from Lahore